Macronemus is a genus of beetles in the family Cerambycidae, containing the following species:

 Macronemus analis (Pascoe, 1866)
 Macronemus antennator (Fabricius, 1801)
 Macronemus asperulus White, 1855
 Macronemus filicornis (Thomson, 1860)
 Macronemus rufescens (Bates, 1862)
 Macronemus verrucosus (Pascoe, 1866)

References

Acanthoderini